The Bârnova Monastery is a Romanian Orthodox monastery located in Bârnova, Iași metropolitan area, Moldavia, Romania. 

Built in 1628 by Moldavian Voivode Miron Barnovschi-Movilă, the monastery is listed in the National Register of Historic Monuments.

The oldest tree in Iași County is the 675-year-old hybrid lime tree (declared Natural Monument), located in the courtyard of Bârnova Monastery. When the lime was about 57 years old and had about 14 centimetres in diameter, Iași was mentioned as an urban settlement, during the reign of Prince Alexander the Good (1408).

References

Historic monuments in Iași County
Romanian Orthodox monasteries of Iași County
Christian monasteries established in the 17th century
1628 establishments in Romania
17th-century architecture in Romania